West Aberdeenshire and Kincardine is a county constituency of the House of Commons of the Parliament of the United Kingdom of Great Britain and Northern Ireland (Westminster), which elects one Member of Parliament (MP) by the first past the post system of election. It was first used in the 1997 general election, but has undergone boundary changes since that date.

There was also a Holyrood constituency of West Aberdeenshire and Kincardine, a constituency of the Scottish Parliament, created in 1999 with the same boundaries as the Westminster constituency at that time.

Boundaries 

1997–2005: Kincardine and Deeside District, and the Gordon District electoral divisions of Donside and South Gordon.

2005–present: The area of the Aberdeenshire Council other than those parts in the Banff and Buchan County Constituency and the Gordon County Constituency.

The constituency covers a southern portion of the Aberdeenshire council area.

As redefined by the Fifth Periodical Review of the Boundary Commission for Scotland. and subsequently first used in the 2005 general election, it is one of five constituencies covering the Aberdeenshire council area and the Aberdeen City council area. To the northeast of West Aberdeenshire and Kincardine there are the constituencies of Aberdeen North and Aberdeen South, which are both entirely within the Aberdeen City area. To the north of West Aberdeenshire and Kincardine, there is the Gordon constituency, which covers part of the Aberdeenshire area and part of the Aberdeen City area, and further north there is the Banff and Buchan constituency which, like West Aberdeenshire and Kincardine, is entirely within the Aberdeenshire area.

The West Aberdeenshire and Kincardine constituency includes the towns of Stonehaven, Portlethen and Banchory, and stretches along the Dee river valley from Westhill to Braemar, and north to Kemnay in the Don river valley, which were with the Gordon constituency until 2005, but are now within this constituency.

Members of Parliament

Election results

Elections in the 2010s

Elections in the 2000s

Elections in the 1990s

References 

Westminster Parliamentary constituencies in Scotland
Constituencies of the Parliament of the United Kingdom established in 1997